DaJuan Michael Summers (born January 24, 1988) is an American professional basketball player. He played college basketball at Georgetown University. In the 2009 NBA draft, he was drafted 35th overall by the Detroit Pistons.

High school career
Summers attended the McDonogh School, a private school in Owings Mills, Maryland. As a junior in 2004–05, he averaged 20.4 points and 11.6 rebounds per game, helping McDonogh to a 23-6 record and to the MIAA A Conference final and a No. 5 ranking in the Baltimore Sun's final poll.

As a senior in 2005–06, he averaged 29.2 points, 11.0 rebounds, 4.0 assists, 2.0 steals and 3.0 blocks per game, leading McDonogh to a 19-6 overall record. He finished his high school career with 1,502 points and a two-time Baltimore Sun Baltimore County Player of the Year (junior and senior).

Considered a five-star recruit by Rivals.com, Summers was listed as the No. 9 small forward and the No. 23 player in the nation in 2006.

College career

In his freshman season at Georgetown, Summers was named to the 2007 Big East All-Rookie team. In 37 games, he averaged 9.2 points, 3.7 rebounds and 1.1 assists per game.

In his sophomore season, he was a second team All-District 4 selection by the National Association of Basketball Coaches. In 33 games, he averaged 11.1 points, 5.4 rebounds and 1.5 assists per game.

In his junior season, he played 31 games, averaging 13.6 points, 4.1 rebounds, 1.3 assists and 1.1 steals per game.

On March 30, 2009, he declared for the NBA draft, foregoing his final year of college eligibility.

Professional career
On June 25, 2009, Summers was selected with the 35th overall pick in the 2009 NBA draft by the Detroit Pistons. In July 2009, he joined the Pistons for the 2009 NBA Summer League. In August 2009, he signed a multi-year deal with the Pistons. In July 2010, he re-joined the Pistons for the 2010 NBA Summer League.

On July 3, 2011, he signed a two-year deal with Montepaschi Siena of Italy. On October 30, 2011, he parted ways with Siena after just four games.

On December 9, 2011, he signed with the New Orleans Hornets. On February 7, 2012, he was waived by the Hornets.

In September 2012, Summers signed with the Charlotte Bobcats. However, he was later waived by the Bobcats on October 27, 2012.

On December 3, 2012, Summers was acquired by the Maine Red Claws. On February 4, 2013, Summers was named to the Futures All-Star roster for the 2013 NBA D-League All-Star Game.

On March 15, 2013, Summers signed a 10-day contract with the Los Angeles Clippers. On March 25, 2013, he signed a second 10-day contract with the Clippers. On April 4, 2013, he signed with the Clippers for the remainder of the season. On July 9, 2013, Summers was waived by the Clippers.

On July 31, 2013, Summers signed a one-year deal with Budivelnyk Kyiv of the Ukrainian Basketball SuperLeague. He sent his family home from Kyiv due to political unrest in Ukraine, but stayed to finish the season.

In July 2014, Summers joined the Brooklyn Nets for the 2014 NBA Summer League. On August 12, 2014, he signed with Gran Canaria of the Liga ACB.

On September 22, 2015, Summers signed with the New York Knicks. However, he was later waived by the Knicks on October 23 after appearing in four preseason games. On November 2, he was acquired by the Westchester Knicks as an affiliate player of New York. On November 23, he was named the D-League's Performer of the Week for games played Thursday, November 12, through Sunday, November 22. The honor marked the first of the 2015–16 season and the first in Westchester Knicks history. The following day, he was ruled out for the rest of the season with a left Achilles tendon injury, an injury he suffered on November 20 in the final two minutes of the team's win over the Sioux Falls Skyforce and was waived on November 24. In three games, Summers led the Knicks to a 3–0 start and averaged 25.3 points, 10.3 rebounds, 2.0 assists and 2.0 steals per game.

On July 28, 2016, Summers signed with Turkish club Pınar Karşıyaka for the 2016–17 season.

On August 3, 2017, he signed with Turkish club Galatasaray for the 2017–18 season.

On July 12, 2019, he has signed with Levallois Metropolitans of the LNB Pro A.  Summers later joined Shimane Susanoo Magic, averaging 17.4 points, 8.0 rebounds, 1.3 assists and 1.1 steals per game. On October 11, 2020, he signed with Indios de Mayagüez of the Baloncesto Superior Nacional (BSN).

Career statistics

NBA

Regular season

|-
| align="left" | 
| align="left" | Detroit
| 44 || 0 || 9.2 || .354 || .357 || .711 || 1.0 || .4 || .2 || .2 || 3.0
|-
| align="left" | 
| align="left" | Detroit
| 22 || 1 || 9.0 || .406 || .429 || .450 || .5 || .1 || .1 || .0 || 3.4
|-
| align="left" | 
| align="left" | New Orleans
| 15 || 6 || 13.9 || .431 || .313 || .778 || 1.5 || .7 || .5 || .0 || 4.5
|-
| align="left" | 
| align="left" | L.A. Clippers
| 2 || 0 || 3.5 || .250 || .000 || .000 || 1.0 || .5 || .0 || .0 || 1.0
|- class="sortbottom"
| align="left" | Career
| align="left" | 
| 83 || 7 || 9.9 || .384 || .367 || .642 || 1.0 || .3 || .2 || .1 || 3.3

Euroleague

|-
| align="left" | 2011–12
| align="left" | Montepaschi Siena
| 1 || 1 || 18.4 || .500 || .000 || .000 || 1.0 || .0 || .0 || .0 || 4.0 || .0
|-
| align="left" | 2013–14
| align="left" | Budivelnyk Kyiv
| 10 || 8 || 27.8 || .426 || .222 || .806 || 4.6 || 1.0 || 1.5 || .6 || 12.3 || 12.5
|- class="sortbottom"
| align="left" | Career
| align="left" | 
| 11 || 9 || 26.9 || .436 || .222 || .806 || 4.3 || .9 || 1.4 || .5 || 11.5 || 11.4

References

External links
 Euroleague.net Profile
 Eurobasket.com Profile
 NBA D-League Profile

1988 births
Living people
American expatriate basketball people in Italy
American expatriate basketball people in Spain
American expatriate basketball people in Turkey
American expatriate basketball people in Ukraine
Basketball players from Baltimore
BC Budivelnyk players
CB Gran Canaria players
Detroit Pistons draft picks
Detroit Pistons players
Galatasaray S.K. (men's basketball) players
Georgetown Hoyas men's basketball players
Karşıyaka basketball players
Liga ACB players
Los Angeles Clippers players
Maine Red Claws players
Mens Sana Basket players
New Orleans Hornets players
Metropolitans 92 players
Small forwards
Westchester Knicks players
American men's basketball players